Eurema lacteola,  the scarce grass yellow,  is a small butterfly of the family Pieridae, that is, the yellows and whites, which is found in India, Peninsular Malaya, Java, Sumatra and Borneo.

See also
List of butterflies of India
List of butterflies of India (Pieridae)

lacteola
Butterflies of Asia
Butterflies described in 1886